Pudukottai is a state assembly constituency in Tamil Nadu. Elections and winners in the constituency are listed below. Election was not held in year 1957. It comes under Tiruchirappalli Lok Sabha constituency for Parliament elections. It is one of the 234 State Legislative Assembly Constituencies in Tamil Nadu, in India.

Madras State

Tamil Nadu 

* By-Elections were held on the account of vacancy due to the demise of the sitting MLA

Election Results

2021

2016

2012 By-election

2011

2006

2001

1996

1991

1989

1984

1980

1977

1971

1967

1962

1952

References 

 

Assembly constituencies of Tamil Nadu
Pudukkottai district